Linda Ruth Williams (born 16 April 1961) is Professor of Film Studies in the College of Humanities at the University of Exeter, UK. Her special interests include sexuality and censorship in cinema and literature (she has written widely on pornography, including a book on soft-core cinema), women in film, psychoanalytic theory and D. H. Lawrence.

Biography

Education
Williams went to school in Bristol, where she grew up, and followed her English degree at Sussex University with an MA in Critical Theory. She earned her PhD from Sussex on Lawrence, Nietzsche, Freud and Feminism.

Career
She has lectured at Liverpool, Manchester and Exeter Universities, and, between 1994 and 2017, at Southampton University. She is currently Professor of Film at the University of Exeter.

She has written several books, including the influential Critical Desire: Psychoanalysis and the Literary Subject and The Erotic Thriller in Contemporary Cinema, and is a regular contributor to the British Film Institute's Sight and Sound magazine, and to radio programmes including Woman's Hour. Her 2006 book, Contemporary American Cinema was co-edited with fellow Southampton lecturer Michael Hammond.

Personal life
She is married to the film critic Mark Kermode, and they have two children. She is co-curator of the annual Shetland Film Festival, Screenplay, run by Shetland Arts, and is a founding organiser of the New Forest Festival.

Publications

Books
 
 
  (With introduction by Williams.)

Book chapters
  (Also wrote numerous reference entries on British Poetry since 1830 for that text.)
 
 
Extracted as:

Journal articles
  Pdf.
 
 
 
  
  (Editors: Howard J. Booth, Elizabeth M. Fox and Fiona Becket.)
  (Interview with director Catherine Breillat.)

References

External links
 
 University of Exeter Biography

1961 births
Alumni of the University of Sussex
Academics of the University of Southampton
British mass media scholars
British non-fiction writers
Living people
Place of birth missing (living people)
British film critics
British women film critics